The following is a list of Little Rock Trojans men's basketball head coaches. There have been 23 head coaches of the Trojans in their 85-season history.

Little Rock's current head coach is Darrell Walker. He was hired as the Trojans' head coach in March 2018, replacing Wes Flanigan, who was fired after the 2017–18 season.

References

Little Rock

Little Rock Trojans basketball, men's, coaches